Buerton is a former civil parish, now in the parish of Aldford and Saighton, in Cheshire West and Chester, England.  It contains two buildings that are recorded in the National Heritage List for England as designated listed buildings, both of which are at Grade II.  This grade is the lowest of the three gradings given to listed buildings and is applied to "buildings of national importance and special interest".  Both of the listed buildings are bridges on the Buerton Approach to Eaton Hall.

See also
Listed buildings in Aldford
Listed buildings in Eaton
Listed buildings in Eccleston
Listed buildings in Golborne David
Listed buildings in Handley
Listed buildings in Huntington
Listed buildings in Poulton
Listed buildings in Pulford
Listed buildings in Saighton

References
Citations

Sources

Listed buildings in Cheshire West and Chester
Lists of listed buildings in Cheshire